The Coming of Stork was the first play written by David Williamson.

The cast for the original production included Alan Finney, Bruce Spence and Peter Cummins.

It was adapted into a feature film in 1971 starring Bruce Spence.

Plot
A socially awkward and loudly left wing student comes to share a flat with three of his University friends with disastrous results.

Background
Williamson was asked to write a ten minute script for a Carlton theatre and ended up writing a full length play.

The play was autobiographical.

References

External links

Review of 1973 Sydney production at The Bulletin

1971 plays
Plays by David Williamson
Australian plays adapted into films